Tranquillityite is silicate mineral with formula (Fe2+)8Ti3Zr2 Si3O24. It is mostly composed of iron, oxygen, silicon, zirconium and titanium with smaller fractions of yttrium and calcium. It is named after the Mare Tranquillitatis (Sea of Tranquility), the place on the Moon from which the rock samples in which it was found were brought during the Apollo 11 mission in 1969. It was the last mineral brought from the Moon which was thought to be unique, with no counterpart on Earth, until it was discovered in Australia in 2011.

Discovery
In 1970, material scientists found a new unnamed Fe, Ti, Zr- silicate mineral containing rare-earths and Y in lunar rock sample 10047. The first detailed analysis of the mineral was published in 1971 and the name "tranquillityite" was proposed and later accepted by the International Mineralogical Association.  It was later found in lunar rock samples from all Apollo missions. Samples were dated by Pb/Pb ion probe techniques.

Together with armalcolite and pyroxferroite, it is one of the three minerals which were first discovered on the Moon, before terrestrial occurrences were found. Fragments of tranquillityite were later found in Northwest Africa, in the NWA 856 Martian meteorite.

Terrestrial occurrences of tranquillityite have been found in six localities in the Pilbara region of Western Australia, in 2011. The Australian occurrences include a number of Proterozoic to Cambrian age diabase and gabbro dikes and sills. It occurs as interstitial grains with zirconolite, baddeleyite, and apatite associated with late stage intergrowths of quartz and feldspar.

Properties
Tranquillityite forms thin stripes up to 15 by 65 micrometres in size in basaltic rocks, where it was produced at a late crystallization stage. It is associated with troilite, pyroxferroite, cristobalite and alkali feldspar. The mineral is nearly opaque and appears dark red-brown in thin crystals. The analyzed samples contain less than 10% impurities (Y, Al, Mn, Cr, Nb and other rare-earth element) and up to 0.01% (100 ppm) of uranium. Presence of a significant amount of uranium allowed scientists to estimate the age of tranquillityite and some associated minerals in Apollo 11 samples as 3710 million years using the uranium–lead dating technique.

Irradiation by alpha particles generated by uranium decay is believed to be the origin of the predominantly amorphous metamict structure of tranquillityite. Longer annealing did not improve the crystalline quality, and annealing at higher temperatures resulted in spontaneous fracture of samples.

The crystals were initially found to have a hexagonal crystal structure with the lattice parameters, a = 1.169 nm, c = 2.225 nm and three formula units per unit cell, but later reassigned a face-centered cubic structure (fluorite-like). This phase was not pure, but intergrown with various intermetallic compounds.

See also
Armalcolite
Pyroxferroite

References
Citations

Bibliography

External links
 Collection of pictures of Tranquillityite (Source: Australian Associated Press/Birger Rasmussen 2012)

Iron(II) minerals
Calcium minerals
Zirconium minerals
Nesosilicates
Apollo 11
Hexagonal minerals